Ben Lucien Burman (December 12, 1895 – November 12, 1984) was an American author and journalist born in Covington, Kentucky. He also fought in both World War I and World War II, and graduated from Harvard University. He was married to Alice Caddy who illustrated many of his children's books, including his most popular books, the Catfish Bend series, which became popular with both children and adults. The series, set in Catfish Bend, Mississippi, tells a tale of the many animal residents of Catfish Bend. It was published in eleven languages.

Burman died from a stroke at the age of 88.

Bibliography
Mississippi, illustrated by wife, Alice Caddy, 1929
 adapted to film as Heaven on Earth in 1931, directed by Russell Mack
Then There's Cripple Creek, 1930
Steamboat 'round the Bend, illustrated by Caddy, 1933
 adapted to film as Steamboat Round the Bend in 1935, directed by John Ford 
Blow for a Landing, 1938
Big River to Cross: Mississippi Life Today, illustrated by Caddy, 1940 
Miracle on the Congo: Report from the Free French Front, 1942
Rooster Crows for Day, illustrated by Caddy, 1945
Everywhere I Roam, illustrated by Caddy, 1949 
Children of Noah: Glimpses of Unknown America, illustrated by Caddy, 1951 
The Four Lives of Mundy Tolliver, 1953 
It's a Big Country: America off the Highways, illustrated by Caddy, 1956
The Street of the Laughing Camel, illustrated by Caddy, 1959 
It's a Big Continent, illustrated by Caddy, 1961
The Generals Wear Cork Hats: An Amazing Adventure That Made World History, illustrated by Caddy, 1963 
The Sign of the Praying Tiger, illustrated by Caddy, 1966
Look Down That Winding River: An Informal Profile of the Mississippi, illustrated by Caddy, 1973
High Water at Catfish Bend, 1952, reprinted, 1981 
Seven Stars for Catfish Bend, 1956, reprinted, 1981 
The Owl Hoots Twice at Catfish Bend, 1961, reprinted, 1981 
Blow a Wild Bugle for Catfish Bend, 1967 
High Treason at Catfish Bend, 1977 
The Strange Invasion of Catfish Bend, 1980
Thunderbolt at Catfish Bend, 1984

Discography
Steamboat 'Round the Bend: Songs & Stories of the Mississippi, 1956, Folkways Records

References

Sources
The New York Times

American children's writers
Writers from Kentucky
Harvard University alumni
1895 births
1984 deaths